ERG theory is a theory in psychology proposed by Clayton Alderfer.

Alderfer further developed Maslow's hierarchy of needs by categorizing the hierarchy into his ERG theory (Existence, Relatedness and Growth). The existence category is concerned with the need for providing the basic material existence requirements of humans. The relatedness category is concerned about the desire for maintaining important interpersonal relationships. The growth category is concerned about the desire for personal development. These include the intrinsic component from Maslow's esteem category and the characteristics included under self-actualization.

Alderfer categorized Maslow's physiological needs and Maslow's safety needs into the existence category, Maslow's social needs and Maslow's extrinsic component of self-esteem needs into the relatedness category, and Maslow's intrinsic component of self-esteem needs and Maslow's self-actualization needs into the growth category. Alderfer also proposed a progression and regression theory to go along with the ERG theory: he said that when needs in a lower category are satisfied, an individual will invest more efforts in the higher category, and when needs in a higher category are frustrated, an individual will invest more efforts in the lower category. For example if self-esteem or self-actualization is not met then an individual will invest more effort in the relatedness category in the hopes of achieving the higher need.

Publication 
This theory was published originally in the journal Organizational Behavior and Human Performance.

See also 

 Engel's law, an economic model for how well basic needs are met 
 John Curtis Gowan
 Juan Antonio Pérez López, spontaneous and rational motivation　
 Manfred Max-Neef's Fundamental human needs
 Maslow's hierarchy of needs
 Metamotivation
 Murray's psychogenic needs
 Need theory
 Need

References

External links 
 A Theory of Human Motivation, original 1943 article by Maslow.

Human development
Interpersonal relationships
Organizational behavior
Personal development
Personal life
Developmental psychology
Motivational theories
Happiness
Stage theories
Psychological concepts
Positive psychology